Hussein Arab Isse, also spelled Hussein Arab Issa, is a Somali politician. He was the Minister of Defence and the Vice President of Somalia of Somalia from 20 July 2011 to 4 November 2012.

Biography
Isse hails from the Reer Iidle sub-division of the Ciidagale Garhajis subclan of the wider Isaaq. He holds dual Somali and American citizenship.

Career
On 20 July 2011, Isse was appointed Somalia's Minister of Defence and a Deputy Prime Minister by the new Premier Abdiweli Mohamed Ali. He succeeded Abdihakim Mohamoud Haji-Faqi in office.

On 18 October 2011, Isse and other Transitional Federal Government (TFG) officials hosted a Kenyan delegation in Mogadishu to discuss security issues cooperation against Al-Shabaab as part of the ongoing coordinated Operation Linda Nchi. Isse and Kenya's Minister of Defence Mohamed Yusuf Haji then signed an agreement to collaborate against the insurgent group. In early June 2012, Kenyan forces were formally integrated into AMISOM.

On 4 November 2012, Isse's term as Defence Minister of Somalia ended, as new Prime Minister Abdi Farah Shirdon reassigned Haji-Faqi to the portfolio.

References

Defence Ministers of Somalia
Government ministers of Somalia
Living people
Year of birth missing (living people)